Pesu is an unreleased Indian Tamil romance film written and directed by debutant Ra. Cyril. It stars newcomers J. Vignesh and Vibha in the lead, and Jayaprakash, comedian M. S. Baskar, Mahadevan and Ajay Ratnam in supporting roles, whilst featuring film score and soundtrack by noted composer Yuvan Shankar Raja. The film was in its post-production stage before it failed to hit theatres for unknown reasons.

Cast
 J. Vignesh
 Vibha
 Jayaprakash
 M. S. Baskar
 Yog Japee
 Rakesh
 Mahadevan
 Ajay Ratnam
 Sachu
 Rajalakshmi

Production
The film is the directorial debut of Ra. Cyril, a former associate of noted directors Kadhir, Durai and Kala Prabhu. According to Cyril, the film will have mainly two color tones, green and white. As the film is said to start in winter and end in spring season, the entire first half of the film will take place in hilly regions with the colour green as its backdrop, whilst the second half will be completely filmed in snowy regions, where the colour white will be the backdrop. The scenes of the first half were shot in Udhagamandalam (Ooty), Kodaikanal and other hill stations, whilst the sequences of the second half were filmed in Himalayas and specifically in Kulu-Manali during 2009. A grand railway station was erected at Kulu Manali at a cost of  30 lakhs, while a church was also created there.

In June 2016, the lead actor J. Vignesh revealed that Pesu may release after the completion of his second project Uthra.

Soundtrack

The soundtrack to the film is composed by Yuvan Shankar Raja, which was released on 2 February 2011. Though earlier reports claimed Yuvan Shankar Raja had composed six songs, the album featured only five songs, with four of them being duets.

The album begins with "Vennira Iravugal" which is sung by Yuvan Shankar himself. Apart from him Haricharan, Roshini, Krish, Rajalakshmi, Rahul Nambiar, Reeta, Vijay Yesudas and Priya Himesh have sung the songs. The album contains a song "Kettimelam" which consists of Hindi lyrics along with Tamil. The album has been receiving positive reviews with "Vennira Iravugal" becoming popular during its release. A critic from Milliblog opined that the film had a "Strangely tolerable soundtrack from Yuvan’s not so distant past".

References

Unreleased Tamil-language films
Indian romance films
Films scored by Yuvan Shankar Raja